"We Gotta Get Out of This Place" is a 1965 rock song by The Animals. 

We Gotta Get Out of This Place may also refer to:

We Gotta Get Out of This Place (album) by Angelic Upstarts (1980)
We Gotta Get Out of This Place (book) by Lawrence Grossberg (1992)
We Gotta Get Outta This Place, 1967 album by Charles Wayne Day